Jeremy Schoenberg (born May 8, 1972) is a former child star from both film and television. He played on Days of Our Lives from 1980 to 1982 as Johnny, Marlena's foster child. Jeremy was nominated for this role in the category of Best Young Actor - Daytime TV Series in the 2nd Annual Young Artist Awards. He also voiced Linus van Pelt on Is This Goodbye, Charlie Brown?, What Have We Learned, Charlie Brown?, The Charlie Brown and Snoopy Show, It's Flashbeagle, Charlie Brown, and Snoopy's Getting Married, Charlie Brown.

Now in his adulthood, Jeremy is a professional opera singer.

External links
 Official website
 
  Where are They Now

Place of birth missing (living people)
Living people
American male child actors
American male voice actors
1972 births